Jack Walsh (born 11 January 2000) is an American-born Australian rugby union player, currently playing for United Rugby Championship side Ospreys. His preferred position is fly-half.

Career
Walsh came through the  academy system, having played his junior rugby for Manly, and been named as a wider training squad player for the Waratahs for the 2020 Super Rugby season. He joined  in July 2020, and represented the side 5 times over the course of the next two seasons. He signed for the  ahead of the 2022–23 United Rugby Championship.

References

External links
itsrugby profile

Living people
Australian rugby union players
New South Wales Waratahs players
Exeter Chiefs players
Ospreys (rugby union) players
Rugby union fly-halves
2000 births
Sportspeople from Florida